"If I Don't Get You The Next One Will" is a song written, recorded and produced by Lynsey de Paul and released in 1976 in the UK as her last single on Jet Records. The B-side of the single was another de Paul song and fan favourite "Season to Season". A longer version of the song was recorded as a track for the 1976 album Take Your Time, but the album was shelved as part of a dispute between de Paul and Arden, and when it was finally released on CD in 1990 in Japan as Before You Go Tonight, the single version was included. This humorous and tongue in cheek song relates many of de Paul's negative dating experiences (sample lyric "I’ve been dated and waited until I was blue, I’ve been cheated, mistreated and broken in two, I've been lied to, denied to, till I've had my fill, so, if I don’t get you, well, the next one will"). One well known muse for the song was former boyfriend, Ringo Starr, who missed a dinner date with de Paul. Indeed, De Paul herself described as being about revenge after Starr missed a dinner appointment with her because he fell asleep in his office. Stylistically, it was quite a departure from previous releases, with prominent use of synthesiser and a sparse arrangement that received positive reviews. At the time, the Record Mirror wrote "Cleverly constructed song with Lynsey's voice playing leap-frog over itself. Uptempo rhythm that winds itself all over the place, following the intricate vocal patterns." 

De Paul performed this song on prime time TV shows such as The Arrows on 18 May 1976. One of De Paul's performances of the song has also been released on DVD. It has been played on US radio and most recently in 2023 on Frankfurt, Germany Radio X. 

Its first appearance on CD outside of Japan was on the 1994 compilation album, Greatest Hits, released on the Repertoire label and, most recently, the song also appeared on the anthology double album, Into My Music, However, it has also been included on her own Best of Lynsey de Paul, Best of the 70s, as well as on The Singles Collection 1974-1979. It is listed as one of de Paul's song highlights on the online music site, AllMusic. "If I Don't Get You The Next One Will" was also a track on the US compilation album Glitter Girlz, that featured female glam rock era contemporaries such as Noosha Fox (lead singer of Fox), Dana Gillespie and Fanny.

It also became the title of a chapter in the book and audiobook, Ringo Starr: Straight Man or Joker, by the writer Adam Clayson, which related this and other amusing stories about de Paul and Starr's time together, both of whom were well known for their sense of humour. An audio book narrated by DJ Mike Read and with a chapter entitled "If I Don't Get You, the Next One Will" was released in 2003 on the Sanctuary label. The story behind the song was also recounted by de Paul herself in an interview for the book "The Ringo Starr Encyclopedia", written by Bill Harry.

References

1976 singles
Jet Records singles
Songs written by Lynsey de Paul